Moradabad is a city in Uttar Pradesh, India.

Moradabad may also refer to:

Iran

Chaharmahal and Bakhtiari Province
Moradabad, Chaharmahal and Bakhtiari, a village in Ardal County

Fars Province
Moradabad, Firuzabad, a village in Firuzabad County
Moradabad, Marvdasht, a village in Marvdasht County
Moradabad, Shiraz, a village in Shiraz County

Hamadan Province
Moradabad, Nahavand, a village in Nahavand County
Moradabad, Tuyserkan, a village in Tuyserkan County

Hormozgan Province
Moradabad, Hormozgan, a village in Rudan County

Ilam Province
Moradabad, Ilam, a village in Darreh Shahr County

Isfahan Province
Moradabad, Isfahan, a village in Shahreza County

Kerman Province
Moradabad, Anbarabad, a village in Anbarabad County
Moradabad, Arzuiyeh, a village in Arzuiyeh County
Moradabad, Fahraj, a village in Fahraj County
Moradabad-e Posht Rig, a village in Fahraj County
Moradabad, Faryab, a village in Faryab County
Moradabad, Jiroft, a village in Jiroft County
Moradabad, Kahnuj, a village in Kahnuj County
Moradabad, Manujan, a village in Manujan County
Moradabad, Qaleh Ganj, a village in Qaleh Ganj County
Moradabad, Rigan, a village in Rigan County
Moradabad 1, a village in Rudbar-e Jonubi County
Moradabad 2, a village in Rudbar-e Jonubi County

Kermanshah Province
Moradabad, Kermanshah, a village in Kermanshah County
Moradabad, Ravansar, a village in Ravansar County

Khuzestan Province
Moradabad, Lali, a village in Lali County
Moradabad, Masjed Soleyman, a village in Masjed Soleyman County
Moradabad, Shush, a village in Shush County

Kurdistan Province
Moradabad, Kurdistan, a village in Dehgolan County

Lorestan Province
Moradabad, Delfan (disambiguation)
Moradabad, Khaveh-ye Jonubi, a village in Khaveh-ye Jonubi Rural District, Central District, Delfan County
Moradabad, Nurabad, a village in Nurabad Rural District, Central District, Delfan County
Moradabad-e Gol Gol, a village in Mirbag-e Shomali Rural District, Central District, Delfan County 
Moradabad-e Mirakhur, a village in Mirbag-e Shomali Rural District, Central District, Delfan County
Moradabad-e Pirdusti, a village in  Itivand-e Shomali Rural District, Kakavand District, Delfan County
Moradabad Nurali, a village in Nurabad Rural District, Central District, Delfan County
Moradabad, Dowreh, a village in Dowreh County
Moradabad, Rumeshkhan, a village in Rumeshkhan County
Moradabad, Selseleh, a village in the Central District of Selseleh County
Moradabad, Firuzabad, Selseleh, a village in Firuzabad District, Selseleh County

Markazi Province
Moradabad, Markazi, a village in Arak County

Qazvin Province
Moradabad, Buin Zahra, a village in Buin Zahra County
Moradabad, Qazvin, a village in Qazvin County

Razavi Khorasan Province
Moradabad, Bakharz, a village in Bakharz County
Moradabad, Dargaz, a village in Dargaz County

Semnan Province
Moradabad, Semnan, a village in Damghan County

Tehran Province
Moradabad, Tehran, a village in Tehran County

Yazd Province
Moradabad, Yazd, a village in Mehriz County

India
Muradabad, Sultanpur, a village in Sultanpur district, Uttar Pradesh